The Weschnitz Valley Railway (German: Weschnitztalbahn) is a railway line in Germany that runs from Weinheim an der Bergstraße in the valley of the River Weschnitz to Fürth im Odenwald.

External links 
 Weinheim Railway Society
 History of the Weschnitztalbahn and information about the work of IG Pro Schiene Weschnitztal- and Überwaldbahn
 Tunnel portals on the Weschnitz Valley Railway
 Photographs of the Überwald and Weschnitz Valley Railways

Railway lines in Hesse
Odenwald